The Potez 4D was a four-cylinder, inverted inline aircraft engine. It was first built shortly before World War II, but did not enter full production until 1949. Like the other D-series engines, the cylinders had a bore of 125 mm (4.9 in) and a stroke of 120 mm (4.7 in). Power for different models was in the 100 kW-190 kW (140 hp-260 hp) range.

Variants
4D-00
4D-01
4D-30
4D-31
4D-32
4D-33
4D-34
4D-36 4D-34 with aerobatic oil system

Applications
 Morane-Saulnier MS.570
 Morane-Saulnier MS.700 Petrel
 Max Holste MH.52
 Nord 1202 Norécrin
 Nord 3202
 Nord 3400
 SIPA S.70
 S.N.C.A.C. NC-840 Chardonneret

Specifications (Potez 4-D 01)

See also

Notes

References

 
 
 

4D
1930s aircraft piston engines